Crinum lorifolium is a species of flowering plants in the family Amaryllidaceae. It is found in India and Myanmar.

Taxonomy

Synonyms
Homotypic
Crinum pratense Herb.
Crinum pratense var. lorifolium (Roxb.) Herb.
Heterotypic
Crinum longifolium Roxb. ex Ker Gawl.
Crinum canalifolium Carey ex Herb.
Crinum elegans Carey ex Herb.
Crinum venustum Carey ex Herb.
Crinum pratense var. canalifolium (Carey ex Herb.) Herb.
Crinum pratense var. elegans (Carey ex Herb.) Herb.
Crinum pratense var. longifolium Herb.
Crinum pratense var. venustum (Carey ex Herb.) Herb.

References

Roxburgh, W. ex Ker Gawl., 1817 In: J. Sci. Arts (London) 3: 110

External links

lorifolium
Plants described in 1817
Flora of India (region)
Flora of Myanmar